Alley Cats Strike is a Disney Channel Original Movie that premiered on March 18, 2000. Directed by Rod Daniel, it stars Kyle Schmid, Robert Ri'chard, and Kaley Cuoco.

Plot
A junior high school basketball game between the cities of East Appleton and West Appleton ends in a tie. The two cities, both vying for a trophy known as The Mighty Apple, must determine the winner through a bowling competition. Alex Thompson and his friends, Delia, Elisa and Ken, are in West Appleton Junior High School's bowling club; they discover that Todd McLemore, a popular basketball player, is also a member of the club, as his friends Leo and Flip had signed him up as a prank.

At a bowling alley operated by Alex's father, Kevin Thompson, Todd reluctantly trains for the upcoming bowling competition with Alex and his friends. He criticizes Alex and his friends for not demonstrating a strong willingness to win, which they deem as overconfidence. Alex later attends a party with Todd, rather than train at the bowling alley with his friends, upsetting them. Todd's bowling improves, while Alex's bowling becomes worse as he continues to spend time with Todd.

The children later redecorate Kevin's bowling alley to bring in customers. Todd uses his popularity to convince various businesses to donate supplies such as paint and flashing lights for the bowling alley, where a party known as the "Bowling Ball" is held and attended by dozens of people. Delia, Elisa, and Ken leave the party early, as they feel betrayed by Alex now frequently hanging out with Todd and his friends. After the party, Alex overhears Todd's friends talking among each other and discovers that they are only pretending to be friends with Alex to increase the chances of their school winning back The Mighty Apple.

Jeff McLemore, Todd's father and the mayor of West Appleton, makes a wager with mayor Hanburger of East Appleton: the winning team, in addition to receiving The Mighty Apple, will also get to choose the name for a new school that is under construction. Hanburger hires Whipsaw McGraw, a bowling champion, to train his bowling team. From the city, the West Appleton bowling team receives low-quality team shirts for the bowling competition. The team is also told about the wager between the mayors, after which Alex quits the team out of anger.

Todd attempts to convince Alex to rejoin the bowling team, and reveals new shirts with the team's name, Alley Cats, on it. Kevin later tells Alex that he used to be friends with Jeff when they were younger, but ended their friendship after accusing the other of losing a baseball game, which they both believe resulted in the city losing The Mighty Apple. Kevin tells Alex to not let a dispute end a friendship.

Alex rejoins the bowling team for the competition the next day. At the end of the competition, Todd's bowling results in a 7-10 split, which he could never master during his training. Delia substitutes for Todd. Using her knowledge of physics, Delia rolls a spinner slowly down the lane and spares, winning the competition, to everyone's surprise. Todd tells his father that it does not seem fair for a school to be named over a game of bowling. Alex and his friends decide to compromise and name the new school Appleton Central.

Cast
 Kyle Schmid as Alex Thompson
 Robert Ri'chard as Todd McLemore
 Kaley Cuoco as Elisa Bowers
 Mimi Paley as Delia Graci
 Joey Wilcots as Ken Long
 Matt McCoy as Mr. Kevin Thompson
 Hardee T. Lineham – Principal Morris
 Evan Noble as Leonardo "Leo"
 Gino Giacomini as "Flip"
 Tim Reid as Mayor Jeff McLemore
 Daphne Maxwell Reid as Mrs. Cathy McLemore
Phillip Williams as Louis "Sweet Lou"
 Rodger Barton as Mayor Hanburger
 Roman Podhora as Coach Fetters
 David Reale as Baron McKay
 Laura Vandervoort as Lauren
 Joan Gregson as Ms. Jenson
 Janet Bailey as Nancy
 Alisha Morrison as Gina
 Marcello Meleca as Bubba
 Bill Lake as "Whipsaw" McGraw
 Booth Stephenson as Bobby Nagurski
 David Talbot as Corning
 Mary Lu Zahalan as Ms. Johnson
 Paul Constable as Bowling Referee
 Rufus Crawford as Ken's Dad
 Elizabeth Lennie as Mrs. Thompson
 Terry Doyle as Grandpa

Production

Popular culture
In 2014, the movie's English Wikipedia article gained attention for having the longest film plot summary on the English-language version of the site.

Soundtrack

References

External links

Alley Cats Strike! – The Wikipedia Summary

2000 television films
2000 films
Ten-pin bowling films
Disney Channel Original Movie films
Films directed by Rod Daniel
American teen comedy-drama films
2000s teen comedy-drama films
Films shot in Ontario
American comedy-drama television films
2000s American films
2000s English-language films